Aap Mujhe Achche Lagne Lage is a 2002 Indian Hindi-language romantic drama directed by Vikram Bhatt, starring Hrithik Roshan and Ameesha Patel. Upon release, it was a critical disaster, receiving overwhelmingly negative reviews. Notably, this is the second and final time the lead pair has worked together after their debut film Kaho Naa... Pyaar Hai (2000).

Plot
Sapna is the only daughter of a wealthy underworld Don, Pratap Dholakia. She lives in terror of her father and brother Raman's tyranny, violence, and dangerous gang associations. Due to their numerous enemies, they have kept Sapna confined at home all her life with only her sister-in-law, Nisha, for company and comfort. Highly sheltered, naïve, and lonely, Sapna longs to break free. 

One night Sapna attends her childhood friend's wedding without Pratap's permission, and on the drive home is attacked by Pratap's rival gang. Rohit, a local college student, witnesses the attack and protects Sapna. They immediately fall in love with each other, but before they can introduce themselves she is rescued by Pratap's men. Livid, Pratap forbids Sapna from ever leaving the house again.

The next morning, Rohit obtains Sapna's name from a newspaper article about the incident. He and his friends manage to enter her home as a musical band, performing for the Navaratri dance celebrations. Sparks fly between him and Sapna over the nine nights of Navaratri and they start meeting secretly. Although Raman is suspicious, Rohit charms Pratap and earns his trust when Sapna explains that he was the one who had saved her on the night of the gang attack. Rohit sneaks Sapna out for excursions around town and takes her home to meet his parents, who receive her lovingly. Nisha discovers their relationship, warning Sapna of Pratap's cruelty and what he and Raman would do to Rohit if they found out. In the meantime, Pratap, thinking that Sapna would be safest abroad, arranges for her to marry the son of a wealthy friend who lives in London. He announces their engagement on the last night of Navaratri in front of all guests, shocking both Sapna and Rohit.

Sapna ends her relationship with Rohit to protect him from her father and brother. Nisha secretly visits Rohit at his boys’ college to explain, begging him to forget Sapna. Undeterred, on the night of Sapna's engagement party, Rohit whisks her away to his hostel, reasoning that it would be the last place Pratap would search for her. With the help of his friends (and, soon, all the boys in the college), Sapna is disguised as a male student and settles in happily, tasting freedom for the first time. Meanwhile, Pratap assumes that Sapna has been abducted by his rival, Kania Pathan, and Raman executes a violent search for her, mercilessly attacking Kania Pathan's men and territory. When this proves futile, Pratap has his telephone bill checked and notices frequent calls to and from an unfamiliar phone number, which happens to be Rohit's. 

Raman and his men arrive at Rohit's hostel, intending to retrieve Sapna by force. In defense, a hundred of Rohit's peers arrive carrying sticks and bats, showing solidarity with Rohit and Sapna. Before a fight can ensue, Pratap appears and publicly berates Raman for coming to the hostel without his permission. He earnestly displays fatherly concern, declaring his approval of Rohit and Sapna's relationship and convincing Sapna to return home with him to prepare for her wedding to Rohit.

Bursting with joy, Sapna arrives back home and tells Nisha of her father's acceptance. Dismayed, Nisha reveals that Pratap deceived Sapna to avoid creating a scene at the hostel, and that her father's pride is more valuable to him than Sapna's happiness. Heartbroken, Sapna pleads with Pratap, who furiously informs her that she is to fly to London that very night. Under the guise of peace, Pratap summons Rohit to his factory, revealing his true intentions. When Rohit refuses to give up Sapna, Pratap orders Raman and his men to kill Rohit. They brutally beat Rohit and toss him in a gully, thinking that he is dead. Sapna overhears Pratap speaking of Rohit's death and overdoses on pills, intending to kill herself. She leaves a suicide note in her room and, before leaving for the airport, informs her father that he has crushed her so much that she wishes to go to be with her (long deceased) mother. After Sapna leaves, Nisha finds her suicide note and throws it at Pratap, screaming at him for selfishly causing his own daughter to commit suicide.

As Raman and his men escort Sapna to the airport, Rohit appears, bloodied and enraged. With renewed strength, he fights them off just as Sapna starts coughing up blood, succumbing to her overdose. He professes his love for her and gets her to a hospital, where she is treated and stabilized. The film concludes with Pratap, emotional and humbled, silently hugging Rohit for saving Sapna's life again and giving the couple his blessing.

Cast

 Hrithik Roshan as Rohit Malhotra
 Ameesha Patel as Sapna Dholakia
 Kiran Kumar as Pratap Dholakia, Sapna's father
 Mukesh Tiwari as Raman Dholakia, Sapna's older brother
 Nishigandha Wad as Nisha Dholakia, Raman's wife
 Alok Nath as Rohit's father
 Madhuri Sanjeev as Rohit's mother
 Shahbaz Khan as Kania Pathan, special appearance as Pratap's gang rival
Prithvi Zutshi as Hasu Patel
 Ali Asgar as Madhu, Rohit's friend
 Pappu Polyester
 Hemant Pandey as Nayansukh, Rohit's roommate

Music
Music was provided by Rajesh Roshan. Lyrics were provided by Dev Kohli and Ibrahim Ashq.

Track listing

References

External links
 

2000s Hindi-language films
2002 films
2002 romantic drama films
Films directed by Vikram Bhatt
Indian romantic drama films
Films scored by Rajesh Roshan
2002 drama films
Hindi-language romance films